Pelagic sediment or pelagite is a fine-grained sediment that accumulates as the result of the settling of particles to the floor of the open ocean, far from land. These particles consist primarily of either the microscopic, calcareous or siliceous shells of phytoplankton or zooplankton; clay-size siliciclastic sediment; or some mixture of these. Trace amounts of meteoric dust and variable amounts of volcanic ash also occur within pelagic sediments. 
Based upon the composition of the ooze, there are three main types of pelagic sediments: siliceous oozes, calcareous oozes, and red clays.

The composition of pelagic sediments is controlled by three main factors. The first factor is the distance from major landmasses, which affects their dilution by terrigenous, or land-derived, sediment. The second factor is water depth, which affects the preservation of both siliceous and calcareous biogenic particles as they settle to the ocean bottom. The final factor is ocean fertility, which controls the amount of biogenic particles produced in surface waters.

Oozes
In case of marine sediments, ooze does not refer to a sediment's consistency, but to its composition, which directly reflects its origin. Ooze is pelagic sediment that consists of at least 30% of microscopic remains of either calcareous or siliceous planktonic debris organisms. The remainder typically consists almost entirely of clay minerals. As a result, the grain size of oozes is often bimodal with a well-defined biogenic silt- to sand-size fraction and siliciclastic clay-size fraction. Oozes can be defined by and classified according to the predominant organisms that compose them. For example, there are diatom, coccolith, foraminifera, globigerina, pteropod, and radiolarian oozes. Oozes are also classified and named according to their mineralogy, i.e. calcareous or siliceous oozes. Whatever their composition, all oozes accumulate extremely slowly, at no more than a few centimeters per millennium.

Calcareous ooze is ooze that is composed of at least 30% of the calcareous microscopic shells—also known as tests—of foraminifera, coccolithophores, and pteropods. This is the most common pelagic sediment by area, covering 48% of the world ocean's floor. This type of ooze accumulates on the ocean floor at depths above the carbonate compensation depth. It accumulates more rapidly than any other pelagic sediment type, with a rate that varies from 0.3–5 cm/1000 yr.

Siliceous ooze is ooze that is composed of at least 30% of the siliceous microscopic "shells" of plankton, such as diatoms and radiolaria. Siliceous oozes often contain lesser proportions of either sponge spicules, silicoflagellates or both. This type of ooze accumulates on the ocean floor at depths below the carbonate compensation depth. Its distribution is also limited to areas with high biological productivity, such as the polar oceans, and upwelling zones near the equator. The least common type of sediment, it covers only 15% of the ocean floor. It accumulates at a slower rate than calcareous ooze: 0.2–1 cm/1000 yr.

Red and brown clays

Red clay, also known as either brown clay or pelagic clay, accumulates in the deepest and most remote areas of the ocean. It covers 38% of the ocean floor and accumulates more slowly than any other sediment type, at only 0.1–0.5 cm/1000 yr.  Containing less than 30% biogenic material, it consists of sediment that remains after the dissolution of both calcareous and siliceous biogenic particles while they settled through the water column. These sediments consist of aeolian quartz, clay minerals, volcanic ash, subordinate residue of siliceous microfossils, and authigenic minerals such as zeolites, limonite and manganese oxides. The bulk of red clay consists of eolian dust. Accessory constituents found in red clay include meteorite dust, fish bones and teeth, whale ear bones, and manganese micro-nodules.

These pelagic sediments are typically bright red to chocolate brown in color. The color results from coatings of iron and manganese oxide on the sediment particles. In the absence of organic carbon, iron and manganese remain in their oxidized states and these clays remain brown after burial. When more deeply buried, brown clay may change into red clay due to the conversion of iron-hydroxides to hematite.

These sediments accumulate on the ocean floor within areas characterized by little planktonic production. The clays which comprise them were transported into the deep ocean in suspension, either in the air over the oceans or in surface waters. Both wind and ocean currents transported these sediments in suspension thousands of kilometers from their terrestrial source. As they were transported, the finer clays may have stayed in suspension for a hundred years or more within the water column before they settled to the ocean bottom. The settling of this clay-size sediment occurred primarily by the formation of clay aggregates by flocculation and by their incorporation into fecal pellets by pelagic organisms.

Distribution and average thickness of marine sediments

Classification of marine sediments by source of particles

See also
 Chalk
 Diatomaceous earth
 Marine geology
 Petrological Database of the Ocean Floor
 Radiolarite
 SedDB, online database for sediment geochemistry
 Biogenous Ooze

Footnotes

External links
 http://www.odp.usyd.edu.au
 Total Sediment Thickness of the World's Oceans and Marginal Seas, Version 2 

Sedimentary rocks
Marine geology
Oceanographical terminology